Colonel The Honourable Kanwar Pratap Singh Bahadur of Kapurthala (1871-5 December 1911) was a Punjabi politician and scholar.

Biography

The son of Kanwar Bikrama Singh of Kapurthala, Pratap Singh was an honorary magistrate and civil judge in Punjab. He served as a member of the Punjab Legislative Council from 1906 to 1911 and the Imperial Legislative Council 1910–1911. He was a founder of the Punjab Chiefs' Association.

Actively involved in the Sikh renaissance movement, Pratap Singh was a scholar of history and religion and was an eminent musicologist of his time.

Awards
1909: Commander of the Order of the Star of India
1911 (posthumous): Knight Commander of Order of the Star of India

See also
 Ahluwalia (misl)
 Harnam Singh
 The Kapurthala Royal Collateral Families
 Rajkumari Amrit Kaur
 Billy Arjan Singh
 Bikrama Singh
 Vishvjit Singh

References

Sources
Sir Lepel Grifin – Rajas of the Punjab. 1873
Griffin & Massey – Chiefs and Families of Note in the Punjab 1909
Challenge and response (1849–1873) by Harbans Singh published in the Sikh Spectrum.com Monthly Issue No.11, April 2003 https://web.archive.org/web/20071012010324/http://www.sikhspectrum.com/042003/challenges.htm

External links
Sikh heritage at www.sikh-heritage.co.uk

1871 births
1911 deaths
Knights Commander of the Order of the Star of India
People from Kapurthala
Punjab, India politicians
History of Sikhism
Indian Sikhs
Members of the Imperial Legislative Council of India